is a Japanese voice actress and singer.

Career
Komatsu passed an audition held at the first corner of Nippon Broadcasting System "Takashi Fujii's All Night Nippon R". A member of "Younger Sister", she left the group in September 2007. She worked at Hirata Office in November 2009 and made her first leading role for the anime series Heroman.

On 25 April 2012, she made her debut as a singer with the ending theme song "Black Holy" from Starchild, which was used for Bodacious Space Pirates. On 7 November 2012, the second single "Cold Room, Alone / Summer Solstice Fruit" was released. It was used for the series "K" and is produced by angela, a senior of Starchild. On 10 November 2013, she performed "Beyond the Emerald Hill", which she wrote, composed, and arranged. On 25 August 2014, she met Mai Kuraki, who admired her, in "Listen? ~ Live 4 Life ~". On 14 February 2015, she sang "Tonight, I feel close to you" with Mai Kuraki in "My Music" broadcast on that day, and played a duet co-star. On 29 September 2015, the broadcast of "A & G NEXT GENERATION Lady Go !!" ended, after 2010.

On 19 July 2016, she announced that would transfer her label to Toy's Factory and receive full-scale production of Q-MHz. Komatsu won the Best Supporting Actress Award at the 16th Seiyu Awards.

Personal life

She passed Level 2 on the English Proficiency Test.

On 12 May 2020, Komatsu announced through her agency that she married voice actor Tomoaki Maeno. On 17 August 2022, she and Maeno announced that she was pregnant with their first child. On 15 January 2023, she gave birth to her first child.

Filmography

Anime series

Anime films

Original net animation
Gundam Build Fighters: GM's Counterattack (2017) – Sei Iori
7 Seeds (2019–2020) – Akane Nashimoto
Romantic Killer (2022) – Riri

Motion comic
Splatoon – Goggle / Knit Cap

Video games

Dubbing

Live-action
Crisis on Earth-X as Supergirl (Kara Zor-El)
Dr. Jin as Hong Young-rae / Yoo Mi-na
Extinction as Lu
Forbidden Games (New Era Movies edition) as Michel Dollé
The Gifted as Lauren Strucker
Humans as Matilda "Mattie" Hawkins
Independence Day: Resurgence as Rain Lao
Insidious: Chapter 3 as Quinn Brenner
Journey to the West: The Demons Strike Back as White Bone Spirit
The Lost Symbol as Katherine Solomon
Mirror Mirror as Snow White
Moon Knight as Layla El-Faouly / Scarlet Scarab
Pee Mak as Nak
Secret Door as Seo Ji-dam
Snakehead Swamp as Ashley
Supergirl as Supergirl (Kara Zor-El)

Animation
Bravest Warriors as Beth

Discography

Studio albums

Singles
 "Baby DayZ"
 "HEARTRAIL"
 "Imagine day, Imagine life!"
 "Maybe the next waltz"

References

External links
 
Official agency profile 
Mikako Komatsu at Toy's Factory 

1988 births
Living people
Anime singers
Japanese female idols
Japanese television personalities
Japanese video game actresses
Japanese voice actresses
Japanese women pop singers
Musicians from Mie Prefecture
Seiyu Award winners
Voice actresses from Mie Prefecture
21st-century Japanese actresses
21st-century Japanese singers
21st-century Japanese women singers